Theodore J. Kisiel (October 30, 1930 – December 25, 2021), Distinguished Research Professor Emeritus of philosophy at Northern Illinois University, was a well-known translator of and commentator on the works of Martin Heidegger.

Work
Kisiel is known for his research on the development of Heidegger's early thought. Among his students are Gerry Stahl, Steven Crowell and Govert Schüller.

According to Kisiel, Heidegger viewed the entire history of both Eastern and Western philosophy (starting with Parmenides) as dominated by ontology, or "the metaphysics of permanent presence". Heidegger saw his work as focusing instead on the temporal, contingent, "thrown" existence of the individual.

Bibliography
The Genesis of Heidegger's Being and Time, Berkeley: University of California Press, 1993.
Heidegger's Way of Thought: Critical and Interpretative Signposts, 2002 
"Heidegger's Gesamtausgabe: An International Scandal of Scholarship", Philosophy Today 39 (1995), pp. 3–15.

See also
Criticism of the Heidegger Gesamtausgabe

References

External links
The Genesis of Heidegger's Being and Time
Heidegger's Way of Thought

Living people
Heidegger scholars
1930 births
American translators